Althaea (minor planet designation: 119 Althaea) is a main-belt asteroid that was discovered by Canadian-American astronomer J. C. Watson on April 3, 1872, and named after Althaea, the mother of Meleager in Greek mythology. Two occultations by Althaea were observed in 2002, only a month apart.

Based upon its spectrum, this is classified as an S-type asteroid. Photometric observations made in 1988 at the Félix Aguilar Observatory produced a light curve with a period of 11.484 ± 0.010 hours with a brightness variation of 0.365 ± 0.010  in magnitude.

References

External links 
 
 

000119
Discoveries by James Craig Watson
Named minor planets
000119
000119
18720403